Luka Brajkovic (born 26 June 1999) is an Austrian professional basketball player for Rio Breogán of the Spanish Liga ACB. He played college basketball for the Davidson Wildcats.

Early career
Brajkovic joined the Dornbirn Lions of the Basketball Zweite Liga in 2015 and did not earn a salary to preserve collegiate eligibility. During the 2016–17 season, he averaged 14.4 points, 8.7 rebounds, and 2.2 blocks per game. Brajkovic considered moving to Germany following the season, but it did not occur. In March 2018, he committed to playing college basketball for Davidson over offers from Stanford, Purdue and Penn State. He chose the Wildcats in part because head coach Bob McKillop travelled to Austria twice to recruit him.

College career
Coming into his freshman season, Brajkovic helped replace the scoring of the departed Peyton Aldridge at Davidson. As a freshman, Brajkovic averaged 11.1 points and six rebounds per game. He had to adjust to the faster speed of the American college game, including changing his passing motion. He averaged 10.3 points and five rebounds per game as a sophomore. As a junior, Brajkovic averaged 10.9 points and six rebounds per game. Over the summer, he trained in Serbia against professional players. On 5 February 2022 Brajkovic scored a career-high 30 points as well as eight rebounds in a 78–73 win over George Washington. He was named Atlantic 10 Player of the Year.

Professional career
On 6 August 2022 he signed with Rio Breogán of the Spanish Liga ACB.

National team career
Brajkovic has represented Austria in several international basketball competitions. In the 2017 FIBA U18 European Championship Division B, he averaged 18.6 points, 10.6 rebounds, and 0.9 assists per game.

Career statistics

College

|-
| style="text-align:left;"| 2018–19
| style="text-align:left;"| Davidson
| 34 || 33 || 24.9 || .549 || .357 || .704 || 6.0 || 1.4 || .4 || 1.1 || 11.1
|-
| style="text-align:left;"| 2019–20
| style="text-align:left;"| Davidson
| 30 || 30 || 24.5 || .519 || .381 || .716 || 5.0 || 1.6 || .1 || .9 || 10.3
|-
| style="text-align:left;"| 2020–21
| style="text-align:left;"| Davidson
| 21 || 21 || 26.8 || .536 || .315 || .623 || 6.0 || 1.8 || .3 || .9 || 10.9
|-
| style="text-align:left;"| 2021–22
| style="text-align:left;"| Davidson
| 34 || 34 || 29.5 || .583 || .409 || .637 || 7.1 || 2.5 || .3 || 1.1 || 14.4
|- class="sortbottom"
| style="text-align:center;" colspan="2"| Career
| 119 || 118 || 26.4 || .551 || .373 || .673 || 6.1 || 1.8 || .3 || 1.0 || 11.8

Personal life 
Luka was born to Slađan and Sanja Brajković. He has a brother named Filip.

References

External links
Davidson Wildcats bio

1999 births
Living people
Austrian men's basketball players
Austrian people of Yugoslav descent
CB Breogán players
Davidson Wildcats men's basketball players
People from Feldkirch, Vorarlberg
Power forwards (basketball)
Sportspeople from Vorarlberg